Karen Beth Disher (born August 7, 1972) is an American film director and storyboard artist in films, TV, cartoons and video games. She was an artist at Blue Sky Studios, an in-house studio at 20th Century Animation (formerly 20th Century Fox Animation).

Life and career
Disher studied traditional 2D animation at NYU's Tisch School of the Arts. After graduation, she joined MTV Animation as a layout artist on Beavis and Butt-head. She then designed the main characters and was the supervising director on the hit series Daria. Meanwhile, she directed two TV feature-length installments in the series, Is It Fall Yet? in 2000 and the follow-up Is It College Yet? in 2002. She then joined Blue Sky Studios, where she worked as a story artist on many animated films, including Robots, Ice Age: The Meltdown, Horton Hears a Who!, Ice Age: Dawn of the Dinosaurs, The Peanuts Movie, and Ferdinand. She was also the head of story on Rio, and directed a short animated film Surviving Sid and a television special Ice Age: A Mammoth Christmas, both part of the Ice Age franchise. In addition to storyboarding and directing, she lent her voice to some minor characters in the films she worked on, most notably to Scratte in Ice Age: Dawn of the Dinosaurs.

In 2018, Disher was tapped to co-direct Blue Sky's first feature-length musical, "Foster", based on an original story written by Disher, co-director Steve Martino, and Tim Federle, with songs to be written by Benj Pasek and Justin Paul. This project was cancelled due to the closure of Blue Sky in 2021.

Disher joined Spire Animation Studios in 2021 as Creative Director, Development and is a founding member of the studio's brain trust, the "Creative Cadre".

Personal life
In 2001, Disher married Robert Todd Partington, then a supervisor of computer graphics and animation technologies for MTV Networks.

Filmography

Film

Television

Video games

References

External links
 

American voice actresses
1972 births
American film actresses
American women film directors
Living people
Place of birth missing (living people)
American women comedians
American film directors
Blue Sky Studios people
American storyboard artists
21st-century American comedians
21st-century American actresses